Andre Stojka  is an American voice actor. He is best known for his role as the voice of Owl in the Winnie-the-Pooh franchises starting with Pooh’s Grand Adventure: The Search for Christopher Robin inheriting the role from Hal Smith after his death in 1994.

Career
Stojka also performed the voice of the horse Starlite in all of the animated Rainbow Brite productions. Other roles include the druid from The Grim Adventures of Billy and Mandy and the King in the Cinderella sequels. He also voiced the Grim Creeper in Scooby-Doo and the Ghoul School.

Starting in September 2009, Stojka took over the role of John Avery Whittaker on the Christian radio series Adventures in Odyssey. This role was previously voiced by Hal Smith (both men voiced Owl from Winnie the Pooh) and Paul Herlinger.

Filmography

Film
Cinderella II: Dreams Come True - The King
Cinderella III: A Twist in Time - The King
The Book of Pooh: Stories from the Heart - Owl
Piglet's Big Movie - Owl
Pooh's Grand Adventure: The Search for Christopher Robin - Owl
Winnie the Pooh: Seasons of Giving - Owl
The Emperor's New Groove - Topo
The Tigger Movie - Owl

Animation
Scooby-Doo and Scrappy-Doo - Additional voices
The Scooby and Scrappy-Doo Puppy Hour - Additional voices
Ri¢hie Ri¢h - Additional voices
Shirt Tales - Additional voices
ABC Weekend Specials - Victim #1, Elder Og, Og Father
The New Scooby and Scrappy-Doo Show - Additional voices
Pac-Man - Additional voices
Pink Panther and Sons - Additional voices
The Super Powers Team: Galactic Guardians - The Scarecrow, Dr. Jonathan Crane, Alfred Pennyworth
Challenge of the GoBots - Professor Robert Frost
The Jetsons - Additional voices
Rainbow Brite and the Star Stealer - Starlite / Wizard / Spectran
Greatest Adventure Stories from Bible - Additional voices
Rainbow Brite - Starlite / Sorrel
Noah's Ark - Additional voices
David and Goliath - Additional voices
Wildfire - Additional voices 
The New Adventures of Jonny Quest - Mr. Trudge
Scooby-Doo and the Ghoul School - The Grim Creeper / Mummy Daddy
Yogi's Treasure Hunt - Additional voices
Superman - Additional voices
Adventures of the Gummi Bears - Doctor Dexter / Knight / Willard
Fantastic Max - Additional voices
Bobby's World - Additional voices
The Pirates of Dark Water - Additional voices
Swat Kats: The Radical Squadron - Dr. Ohm
A Winnie the Pooh Thanksgiving - Owl
Winnie the Pooh: A Valentine for You - Owl
The Book of Pooh - Owl
Men in Black - Additional voices 
Darkwing Duck - Company Boss
House of Mouse - Archimedes
The Pirates of Dark Water - Additional voices
Cow and Chicken - Announcer #1 / Doctor
The Grim Adventures of Billy & Mandy - Basil / Bear #2 / Owl
The Life & Times of Tim - Pudding Man
Winnie the Pooh: ABC's - Owl
Winnie the Pooh: 123's - Owl
Winnie the Pooh: Wonderful Word Adventure - Owl
Winnie the Pooh: Shape and Sizes - Owl

Anime
Pom Poko - Osho (English dub)

Direct-to-video
The Wacky Adventures of Ronald McDonald - Royal Chef

Video games
Winnie the Pooh Toddler - Owl
Winnie the Pooh Kindergarten - Owl
Tigger's Honey Hunt - Owl
Pooh's Party Game: In Search of the Treasure - Owl
The Mark of Kri - Mauruku
Piglet's Big Game - Owl
Winnie the Pooh's Rumbly Tumbly Adventure - Owl
Onimusha: Dawn of Dreams - Additional voices
Kingdom Hearts II - Owl
Kingdom Hearts II Final Mix - Owl

Radio
Adventures in Odyssey - Mr. Whittaker

Live-action
Wolfen - ESS Voice (voice)
McDonaldland - Professor
Simplicity and Complication - Tony
Some Gave All - Drunk Patron
 - George
Coyotes - Luis Castillo
The Grindhouse Radio - Himself

Crew work
The Virginian - Associate producer (1 episode)

References

External links
 Official website
 
 

Living people
American male radio actors
American male video game actors
American male voice actors
American people of Serbian descent

1944 births